Mandoli is a village in Jalore district of Rajasthan state in India. It is known mainly for the Jain temple dedicated to Guru Shri  Shantivijay Surishwarji.The village lies on Jalore-Bhinmal bus route 35 km from Jalore and 5 km from Ramsin.

Villages in Jalore district
Jain temples in Rajasthan